Beatrice Gelber is an American psychologist best known for her work on associative learning in protozoa, suggesting that synaptic plasticity is not an essential neurochemical mechanism for learning and memory.

Education and career 

According to a personal interview I conducted with her in the 1990s for a report on her for an undergraduate class at San Jose State, my great-grandmother, Dr. Beatrice Gelber, earned a doctorate in psychology from the University of Chicago and also attended Columbia University. She held a professorship at Indiana University until 1960, when she left to found the Basic Research Institute of Health.

Research 
Gelber is known for her research on the intracellular mechanisms of learning and behavior. She demonstrated that Paramecium aurelia could form associations after training, reminiscent of associative learning in multicellular organisms. She suggested that these behavior modifications could be produced through modification of biological macromolecules such as protein or RNA-protein complexes, influencing the dynamic equilibrium of said key molecules. Her findings were contested by contemporaries such as Donald D. Jensen, who criticized the use of protozoans in comparative learning studies.

References

American women psychologists
21st-century American psychologists
20th-century American women scientists
20th-century American scientists
University of Chicago faculty
Living people
Indiana University alumni
Year of birth missing (living people)
American women academics
21st-century American women